Svend Olufsen was a Danish electrical engineer who co-founded Bang & Olufsen with Peter Bang. Like Bang, Olufsen studied at the Technical University of Aarhus. Olufsen and Bang both shared an enthusiasm for radio, which at the time was in its infancy.

After Bang returned from a trip to the United States, he and Olufsen began running experiments in Olufsen's family manor, Quistrop, in Struer, Denmark. Their company, Bang & Olufsen, was formally established on 17 November 1925, with Olufsen primarily focusing on the business aspects.  Olufsen's mother, Anna, helped fund the company through the sale of their family's eggs. Their first commercially viable product came in 1927 with the production of a radio that could connect to alternating current, rather than be battery-powered.

See also

 Bang & Olufsen

References

1897 births
1949 deaths
20th-century Danish businesspeople
20th-century Danish engineers
Danish company founders
People from Struer Municipality